Gwaebeop Renecite Station is a station of the BGLRT Line of Busan Metro in Gwaebeop-dong, Sasang District, Busan, South Korea. The subname in parentheses of BGL is Gangbyeon Park where the Samrak Riverside Sports Park is nearby. A riverside bridge is installed from this station to the Samrak Riverside Sports Park.

Station Layout

Exits

Gallery

External links
  Cyber station information from Busan Transportation Corporation

Busan Metro stations
Busan–Gimhae Light Rail Transit
Sasang District
Railway stations opened in 2011